Ian McClenaghan (born 30 May 1946) is a South African cricketer. He played in forty first-class and eight List A matches for Border from 1968/69 to 1978/79.

See also
 List of Border representative cricketers

References

External links
 

1946 births
Living people
South African cricketers
Border cricketers
Cricketers from East London, Eastern Cape